Andrei Yakovlevich Eshpai (15 May 1925 – 8 November 2015) was an ethnic Mari (Russian and Soviet) composer. He was awarded the title of People's Artist of the USSR in 1981.

Biography 
Eshpai was born at Kozmodemyansk, Mari ASSR, Russian SFSR to a Mari father and Russian mother. A Red Army World War II veteran, he studied piano at Moscow Conservatory from 1948 to 1953 under Vladimir Sofronitsky, and composition under Nikolai Rakov, Nikolai Myaskovsky and Evgeny Golubev. He performed his postgraduate study under Aram Khachaturian from 1953 to 1956.

Eshpai was the son of the composer Yakov Eshpai, and the father of the filmmaker Andrei Andreyevich Eshpai.

On 8 November 2015, Eshpai died in Moscow from a stroke at the age of 90.

Notable works

Stage 
 Nobody Is Happier Than Me, operetta (1968–1969); libretto by V. Konstantinov and B. Ratser
 Love Is Forbidden, musical (1973)
 Angara, ballet (1974–1975)
 A Circle, ballet (1979–1980)

Orchestral 
 Symphonic Dances on Mari Themes (1951)
 Symphony no. 1 in E minor (1959)
 Symphony no. 2 in A major "Praise the Light" (1962)
 Symphony no. 3 (1964)
 Symphony no. 4 "Symphony-Ballet" (1980-1981)
 Simon Bolivar, Symphonic Poem (1982)
 Symphony No. 5 (1985)
 Symphony No. 6 "Liturgic" for mixed chorus, baritone (or bass) and symphony orchestra (1988)
 Symphony No. 7 (1991)
 Games (1997)
 Symphony No. 8 (2000–2001)
 Symphony No. 9 "Four Verses" for symphony orchestra, mixed chorus and narrators (1998–1999)

Concertante 
 Piano Concerto No. 1 in F minor (1954)
 Violin Concerto No. 1 in G minor (1956)
 Concerto Grosso, Concerto for orchestra with solo trumpet, piano, vibraphone and double bass (1966–1967)
 Piano Concerto No. 2 (1972)
 Violin Concerto No. 2 (1977)
 Viola Concerto (1987)
 Cello Concerto (1989)
 Clarinet Concerto (1995)
 Flute Concerto (1992)
 Violin Concerto No. 3 "Bartok Concerto" (1990–1992)
 Violin Concerto No. 4 (1993)
 Oboe Concerto (1982)
 Concerto for trumpet, trombone and orchestra (1994–1995)
 Double Bass Concerto (1994–1995)
 Horn Concerto in F major (1995)
 Tuba Concerto (2001)
 Bassoon Concerto Opus Singularis (2001)

Other 
 3 violin sonatas
 piano compositions
 songs

References

External links 
 Eshpai at Onno van Rijen's site
 Eshpai at Peoples 

1925 births
2015 deaths
People from Mari El
Mari people
Members of the Congress of People's Deputies of the Soviet Union
20th-century composers
20th-century pianists
21st-century composers
21st-century pianists
Male film score composers
Russian ballet composers
Russian classical musicians
Russian classical pianists
Russian film score composers
Russian male composers
Russian music educators
Russian pianists
Soviet classical musicians
Soviet classical pianists
Soviet film score composers
Soviet male composers
Soviet music educators
Soviet pianists
Albany Records artists
Moscow Conservatory alumni
Academic staff of Moscow Conservatory
Academicians of the Russian Academy of Cinema Arts and Sciences "Nika"
Soviet military personnel of World War II
People's Artists of the USSR
People's Artists of the RSFSR
Recipients of the USSR State Prize
Lenin Prize winners
Recipients of the Order of Lenin
Recipients of the Order of the Red Banner of Labour
Recipients of the Order of the Red Star
Recipients of the Order "For Merit to the Fatherland", 4th class
Recipients of the Medal of Zhukov
Burials at Novodevichy Cemetery